The JSC Makeyev Design Bureau (also known as Makeyev OKB) is a Russian missile design company located in Miass, Russia.

Established in December 1947 as SKB-385 in Zlatoust (see Zlatoust Machine-Building Plant), the company was the main designer of submarine-launched ballistic missiles (SLBM) in Russia. In 1955, the company was moved to Miass. In 1965, SKB-385 was redesignated the Design Bureau of Machine-Building (KBM) under the Ministry of General Machine-Building. In 1993, the organization was posthumously renamed in honor of Victor Makeyev, who had been the Chief Designer of SKB-385. Its full official name is State Rocket Center «Academician V.P. Makeev Design Bureau».

Rockets and missiles
R-11 Zemlya
R-13 (missile)
R-17 Elbrus
R-21 (missile)
Shtil'
Volna
R-27 Zyb
R-29 Vysota
R-29RM Shtil
R-29RMU Sineva
R-29RMU2 Layner
R-39 Rif
RS-28 Sarmat
CORONA
ROSSIYANKA

References

External links 
 Makeyev homepage (English)
 Makeyev Rocket Design Bureau at the Nuclear Threat Initiative

 
Defence companies of Russia
Aerospace companies of the Soviet Union
Defence companies of the Soviet Union
Soviet and Russian space institutions
Science and technology in the Soviet Union
Roscosmos divisions and subsidiaries
Companies based in Chelyabinsk Oblast
Design bureaus